The Glens of Antrim Historical Society (founded 1965) is a society for those interested in the history of the Glens of Antrim. It is  recognised as one of the leading historical societies on the island of Ireland. Since 1975 it has published a journal called The Glynns.

References

External links
website of the Glens of Antrim Historical Society

Glens of County Antrim
Historical societies based in the Republic of Ireland